Mansur Arab (also Romanized as Manşūr ‘Arab) is a village in Bavaleh Rural District, in the Central District of Sonqor County, Kermanshah Province, Iran. At the 2006 census, its population was 252, in 61 families.

References 

Populated places in Sonqor County